Hugh Ormond Dunbar (27 June 1903 – 17 July 1985) was an Australian rules footballer who played with Melbourne and St Kilda  in the Victorian Football League (VFL).

Dunbar, recruited from Carlsruhe, was a ruckman, but played at centre-half back for Melbourne in their 1926 premiership team. He represented Victoria in 1923, 1924 and 1926. His brothers, Edgar and Harold, also played for Melbourne. 

Dunbar went to Victorian Football Association (VFA) club Brighton as playing coach in 1929 then played briefly for St Kilda in 1930, before going to the Ormond Amateurs as coach.

References

External links

1903 births
1985 deaths
Australian rules footballers from Victoria (Australia)
Australian Rules footballers: place kick exponents
Melbourne Football Club players
St Kilda Football Club players
Brighton Football Club players
Brighton Football Club coaches
Ormond Amateur Football Club players
Melbourne Football Club Premiership players
One-time VFL/AFL Premiership players
People from Traralgon